Alnus acuminata is a species of deciduous tree in the Betulaceae family. It is found in montane forests from central Mexico to Argentina.

Description

The bark has many yellowish lenticels. The leaves are simple, oval with toothed margins. The inflorescences are catkins, separate male and female flowers on the same tree. There are 80 to 100 winged seeds per fruit, and these are liberated when ripe, leaving the dried out fruit husks on the tree.

There are three subspecies: Alnus acuminata subsp. acuminata occurs from Colombia and Venezuela south to northern Argentina; Alnus acuminata subsp. arguta (Schltdl.) Furlow occurs from northwestern Mexico south to Panama; and Alnus acuminata subsp. glabrata (Fernald) Furlow occurs in central and southern Mexico.

Distribution and habitat
It mostly grows on areas with 1000–3000 mm of rainfall, on slopes and valleys. It tolerates poor soils and acid conditions, but prefers silt or sandy silt soils. It is a fast-growing tree, a pioneer species used for watershed protection and can be used for soil improvement because it has root nodules that fix nitrogen.

Timber
The timber is light to mid reddish-brown and fine grained. It is used for building bridges and pilings, for making coffins, boxes, crates, furniture and plywood. It also makes a good firewood that burns steadily.

References

External links

Trees of Guatemala
acuminata
Trees of Mexico
Trees of Central America
Trees of South America
Trees of Peru
Trees of Argentina
Trees of Colombia
Trees of Bolivia
Trees of Venezuela
Plants described in 1817
Least concern plants
Least concern flora of North America
Least concern biota of South America
Taxonomy articles created by Polbot
Yungas
Flora of the Southern Andean Yungas